The 2020–21 Czech National Football League (known as the Fortuna národní liga for sponsorship reasons) is the 28th season of the Czech Republic's second tier football league. The league is being played with 14 clubs due to uneven promotion/relegation with the Czech First League at the end of the previous season.

Two matches in the third round of fixtures were postponed due to coronavirus concerns. Eight players from Vyšehrad tested positive, resulting in their match against Táborsko having to be played at a later date. Due to players from Vlašim's A, B and junior teams testing positive, their away match against Třinec could not be played on the originally scheduled date either.

Team changes

From FNL 
 FK Pardubice (promoted to 2020–21 Czech First League)
 FC Zbrojovka Brno (promoted to 2020–21 Czech First League)
 FK Baník Sokolov (relegated to Bohemian Football League)
 MFK Vítkovice (relegated to Czech Fourth Division, group F)

To FNL 
 Táborsko (promoted from 2019–20 Bohemian Football League)
 Blansko (promoted from 2019–20 Moravian–Silesian Football League)

Team overview

Locations and stadiums
The home stadium of FK Viktoria Žižkov was not certified by the league to host matches. The club opted to play their home league matches for the autumn part of the season at Stadion SK Prosek in Prague.

League table

Results

References

External links
 Fortuna národní liga

2
Czech National Football League seasons
Czech Republic

Czech National Football League